Schow is a surname. Notable people with the surname include:

David J. Schow (born 1955), American author
Joseph Schow, Canadian politician
Niels Rosing-Schow (born 1954), Danish composer
Keith Schow (1930–1988), Australian rules footballer
Ray Schow, American politician